Hill & Taylor were an architectural partnership in Cairns, Queensland, Australia. A number of their works are now heritage-listed.

History 

The partnership was resumed in 1945 but was dissolved in 1952. During the interwar years Hill and Taylor developed an extensive practice in northern Queensland.

Significant works 

Significant works of Hill & Taylor include:
 Cairns City Council Chambers (1929-1930)
 Cairns Post Office (1930)
 Mossman District Hospital (circa 1930)
 Johnstone Shire Hall at Innisfail (1935-1938)
 Emergency operating theatre at Boulia (1936)
Mossman Shire Hall and Douglas Shire Council Chambers (1936-1937)
 Nurses' quarters at Cairns (1937)
 Mareeba Hospital (1937)
 Proserpine Hospital (1939-1940)
 Barron Valley Hotel at Atherton (1940)

References

Attribution 
 This Wikipedia article was originally based on "The Queensland heritage register" published by the State of Queensland under CC-BY 3.0 AU license (accessed on 7 July 2014, archived on 8 October 2014).

Architects from Queensland